Following is an incomplete list of past and present Members of Parliament (or "MPs") of the United Kingdom whose surnames begin with N.  The dates in parentheses are the periods for which they were MPs.

Gerald Nabarro (1950-1964)
Lisa Nandy (2010–present)
Dadabhai Naoroji (1896)
Doug Naysmith (1997-2010)
Airey Neave (1953-1979)
Richard Needham (1979-1983)
Michael Neubert (1974–1997)
Walton Newbold
Stanley Newens
Brooks Newmark
George Newnes (1885–1895)
Isaac Newton
Tony Newton (1974–1997)
Patrick Nicholls
David Nicholson
Emma Nicholson
Jim Nicholson
Harold Nicolson (1935–1945)
Nigel Nicolson (1952–1959)
Michael Noble, Baron Glenkinglas
Philip Noel-Baker
Caroline Nokes
Archie Norman
Sir Henry Norman, 1st Baronet (1910–1923)
Tom Normanton
Dan Norris
Steven Norris
Sir Gregory Norton, 1st Baronet (1645–1652)
John Nott
George Nugent
Anthony Nutting

 N